Oxyurichthys cornutus, commonly known as the horned tentacle goby, is a species of goby is found in Fiji, Australia, Papua New Guinea, Indonesia, Philippines, Japan, Palau, Solomon Islands, Samoa.

References

cornutus
Fish of Australia
Fish of the Pacific Ocean
Fish of the Philippines
Fish of Indonesia
Fish of Papua New Guinea
Fish of Palau
Fish of the Solomon Islands
Fish of Japan
Taxa named by Allan Riverstone McCulloch 
Taxa named by Edgar Ravenswood Waite
Fish described in 2013